Fairview Mall may refer to the following shopping centres in Canada:

 Fairview Mall, Toronto, Ontario
 CF Fairview Park (formerly known as Fairview Park Mall), Kitchener, Ontario
 Fairview Pointe-Claire, Pointe-Claire, Quebec